New Albany and Salem Railroad Station, also known as Monon Station, was a historic train station located at New Albany, Indiana. The head-house was built about 1851, and was a two-story rectangular brick head-house. It had one-story wings and a long train shed at the rear added in the late 19th century.

The station was listed on the National Register of Historic Places in 1984. The building caught fire in March 1995, weakening the structure. It was torn down later that year. It was subsequently delisted from the National Register in 1996.

References

External links

Buildings and structures in New Albany, Indiana
Former National Register of Historic Places in Indiana
Historic American Engineering Record in Indiana
Railway stations on the National Register of Historic Places in Indiana
Railway stations in the United States opened in 1851
National Register of Historic Places in Floyd County, Indiana
1851 establishments in Indiana
Buildings and structures demolished in 1995
Former Monon Railroad stations
Transportation buildings and structures in Floyd County, Indiana
Former railway stations in Indiana
Demolished railway stations in the United States